Yellow Air Taxi (a marketing name of Friendship Airways) was an air taxi airline based in Fort Lauderdale, Florida. It operated on-demand passenger services in the Southeast, Florida, the Caribbean and, the Bahamas. YAT grew from a small operation out of Pompano Beach to a fleet of four Cessna 402Cs, all painted in yellow with a white/black checkerboard tail. The carrier had some issues with the US DOT, bordering on offering scheduled service as a charter airline. Once legal to fly more than four flights a week, YAT expanded to Naples & Key West, along with offering three flights a day to Marsh Harbour and Treasure Cay from Ft. Lauderdale.  Miami service was attempted in 2009.

YAT started being affected by the high-seasonality of both the Florida Keys and Bahamas and the carrier relinquished their scheduled authority in 2009. Yellow Air Taxi has since gone out of business. On February 18, 2011, an involuntary petition for liquidation under Chapter 7 was filed against Friendship Airways Inc.

Destinations

Florida 

Fort Lauderdale
Tampa

Previous destinations
Key West International Airport
Naples Municipal Airport
Marsh Harbour International Airport
Bimini
Treasure Cay
North Eleuthera international Airport
Miami International Airport

Fleet
The Yellow Air Taxi fleet consists of the following aircraft as of July 2010:

References

Companies based in Fort Lauderdale, Florida
Airlines based in Florida
Defunct companies based in Florida
Defunct airlines of the United States
Airlines established in 2003
2003 establishments in Florida